China Huarong Asset Management Co., Ltd. known as just China Huarong is a majority state-owned financial asset management company in China, with a focus on distressed debt management. It was one of the four asset management companies that the Government of China established in 1999 in response to the 1997 Asian financial crisis.

History 
On November 11, 1999, China Huarong was incorporated in Beijing as China Huarong Asset Management Corporation, which was one of the four asset management companies as approved by the State Council of the People's Republic of China. In 2000, China Huarong began acquiring a Non-performing loan of RMB 407,696 million from the Industrial and Commercial Bank of China. The company later became a limited company: China Huarong Asset Management Co., Ltd. in 2012.

In August 2014, China Huarong introduced seven strategic investors, including Warburg Pincus, CITIC Securities International, Khazanah Nasional, China International Capital Corporation, COFCO Group, Fosun International, and Goldman Sachs while the Ministry of Finance of the People's Republic of China remained the majority controlling shareholder and China Life Insurance Group increased its shareholding.

In October 2015, China Huarong raised HK$17.8 billion through an initial public offering (IPO), offering 5.77 billion new shares in Hong Kong.

Trial and execution of Lai Xiaomin

In April 2018, the Central Commission for Discipline Inspection, and the National Supervisory Commission launched an investigation into possible "serious violations of discipline and laws" of Lai Xiaomin, the Chairman of China Huarong Asset Management, and the Party Chief of China Huarong's CCP Committee.  Lai was a member of the Communist Party of China. As the Party Chief, he emphasized in 2015 that during the operation of China Huarong Asset Management, CCP Committee should play a central role, and party members should play an exemplary role. On October 15, 2018, Lai Xiaomin was expelled from the CCP. On August 11, 2020, the No. 2 Intermediate People's Court of Tianjin opened a public hearing on the case of bribery, corruption, and bigamy of Lai Xiaomin. The indictment alleges that Lai Xiaomin accepted 1.788 billion yuan in bribes, and illegally occupied public funds 25.13 million Yuan. On 5 January 2021, Lai was found guilty of receiving 1.79 billion yuan ($277.3 million) in bribes and bigamy and was sentenced to death without reprieve for bribery, embezzlement, and bigamy. His private assets were seized as well. The sentence was carried out on 29 January 2021.

2021 Bond selloff and default fears
In April 2021, offshore U.S. dollar bonds issued by China Huarong plunged in value. The selloff came after the company missed an end-March deadline to release its 2020 financial results. Fears of a near-term default were eased after the company was said to have prepared funds for full repayment of S$600 million ($450 million) offshore bonds due April 27. To reduce the risk of market contagion and to stabilize its cash flow, Chinese regulators asked Chinese banks to provide loans to China Huarong.

Subsidiaries
 Huarong International Financial

Equity investments
 Baiyin Nonferrous (0.30%)
 Fenxi Mining Industry Group
 Taiyuan Coal Gasification Group (2.46%)
 Xinjiang Ba Yi Iron and Steel Group (7.95%)
 Fullshare Holdings (9.88% indirectly)

 Uxin (5.48%)
Former
 Wanhua Industrial Group (15.04%)

References

External links
 

Companies listed on the Hong Kong Stock Exchange
Investment management companies of China
Financial services companies of China
Government-owned companies of China
H shares